Bình Liêu is a township and capital of Bình Liêu District, Quảng Ninh Province, Vietnam.

References

Populated places in Quảng Ninh province
District capitals in Vietnam
Townships in Vietnam